Pollution in China is one aspect of the broader topic of environmental issues in China. Various forms of pollution have increased as China has industrialised, which has caused widespread environmental health problems.

Pollution statistics

The immense growth of the People's Republic of China since the 1980s has resulted in increased soil pollution. The State Environmental Protection Administration believes it to be a threat to the environment, food safety and sustainable agriculture. 38,610 square miles (100,000 km2) of China's cultivated land have been polluted, with contaminated water being used to irrigate further 31.5 million miles (21,670 km2.), and another 2 million miles (1,300 km2) have been covered or destroyed by solid waste. The affected area accounts of one-tenth of China's cultivatable land. An estimated 6 million tonnes of food grain are contaminated by heavy metals every year, causing direct losses of 29 billion yuan (US$2.57 billion). Heavy metals (including mercury, lead, cadmium, copper, nickel, chromium, and zinc) in the contaminated soil have adverse health effects on human metabolism. Ingestion, contact through skin, diet through the soil-food chain, respiratory intake, and oral intake can deliver the toxic substances to human beings.

Waste
As China's waste production increases, insufficient efforts to develop capable recycling systems have been attributed to a lack of environmental awareness. In 2012, the waste generation in China was 300 million tons (229.4 kg/cap/yr).

A ban came into effect on 15 June 2008 that prohibited all supermarkets, department stores and shops throughout China from giving out free plastic bags, therefore encouraging people to use cloth bags. Stores must clearly mark the price of plastic shopping bags and are banned from adding that price onto the price of products. The production, sale and use of ultra-thin plastic bagsthose less than 0.025 millimeters (0.00098  in) thickare also banned. The State Council called for "a return to cloth bags and shopping baskets." This ban, however, does not affect the widespread use of paper shopping bags at clothing stores or the use of plastic bags at restaurants for takeout food. A survey by the International Food Packaging Association found that in the year after the ban was implemented, 10 percent fewer plastic bags found their way into the garbage.

"White pollution"
The term "white pollution" (less often "white garbage" ) appears to be local to China and later to South Asia, enjoying far less use and recognition outside of the region. It refers to the color of white plastic shopping bags, styrofoam containers, and other light-colored materials that began turning up in visible volume in agricultural fields, the landscape, and waterways in the mid- to late 1990's. The first references to the term "white pollution" appear in official language at least as early as 1999, when the first bans were imposed by the State Council.

Electronic waste

In 2011, China produced 2.3 million tons of electronic waste. The annual amount is expected to increase as the Chinese economy grows. In addition to domestic waste production, large amounts of electronic waste are imported from overseas. Legislation banning importation of electronic waste and requiring proper disposal of domestic waste has recently been introduced, but has been criticized as insufficient and susceptible to fraud. There have been local successes, such as in the city of Tianjin where 38,000 tons of electronic waste were disposed of properly in 2010, but much electronic waste is still improperly handled.

Industrial pollution

In 1997, the World Bank issued a report targeting China's policy towards industrial pollution. The report stated that "hundreds of thousands of premature deaths and incidents of serious respiratory illness have been caused by exposure to industrial air pollution.Since the Industrial Revolution, air pollution has been a major source of worry for human growth. Using an original survey in China, we give the first causal estimates of pollution's impact on political opinions. Seriously contaminated by industrial discharges, many of China's waterways are largely unfit for direct human use." However, the report did acknowledge that environmental regulations and industrial reforms have had some effect. It was determined that continued environmental reforms were likely to have a large effect on reducing industrial pollution.

In a 2007 article about China's pollution problem, the New York Times stated that "Environmental degradation is now so severe, with such stark domestic and international repercussions, that pollution poses not only a major long-term burden on the Chinese public but also an acute political challenge to the ruling Communist Party." The article's main points included:

 According to the Chinese Ministry of Health, industrial pollution has made cancer China's leading cause of death.
 Every year, ambient air pollution alone killed hundreds of thousands of citizens.
 500 million people in China are without safe and clean drinking water.
 Only 1% of the country's 560 million city dwellers breathe air considered safe by the European Union, because all of its major cities are constantly covered in a "toxic gray shroud". Before and during the 2008 Summer Olympics, Beijing was "frantically searching for a magic formula, a meteorological deus ex machina, to clear its skies for the 2008 Olympics."
 Lead poisoning or other types of local pollution continue to kill many children.
 A large section of the ocean is without marine life because of massive algal blooms caused by the high nutrients in the water.
 The pollution has spread internationally: sulfur dioxide and nitrogen oxides fall as acid rain on Seoul, South Korea, and Tokyo; and according to the Journal of Geophysical Research, the pollution even reaches Los Angeles in the US.
 The Chinese Academy of Environmental Planning in 2003 produced an unpublished internal report which estimated that 300,000 people die each year from ambient air pollution, mostly of heart disease and lung cancer.
 Chinese environmental experts in 2005 issued another report, estimating that annual premature deaths attributable to outdoor air pollution were likely to reach 380,000 in 2010 and 550,000 in 2020.
 A 2007 World Bank report conducted with China's national environmental agency found that "[...] outdoor air pollution was already causing 350,000 to 400,000 premature deaths a year. Indoor pollution contributed to the deaths of an additional 300,000 people, while 60,000 died from diarrhoea, bladder and stomach cancer and other diseases that can be caused by water-borne pollution." World Bank officials said "China’s environmental agency insisted that the health statistics be removed from the published version of the report, citing the possible impact on 'social stability'".

A draft of a 2007 combined World Bank and SEPA report stated that up to 760,000 people died prematurely each year in China because of air and water pollution. High levels of air pollution in China's cities caused to 350,000–400,000 premature deaths. Another 300,000 died because of indoor air of poor quality. There were 60,000 premature deaths each year because of water of poor quality. Chinese officials asked that some of the results should not be published in order to avoid social unrest.

China has made some improvements in environmental protection during recent years. According to the World Bank, 'China is one of a few countries in the world that have been rapidly increasing their forest cover. It is managing to reduce air and water pollution.

Vennemo et al., in a 2009 literature review in Review of Environmental Economics and Policy, noted the wide discrepancy between the reassuring view in some Chinese official publications and the exclusively negative view in some Western sources. The review stated that "although China is starting from a point of grave pollution, it is setting priorities and making progress that resemble what occurred in industrialized countries during their earlier stages of development." Environmental trends were described as uneven. A quality of surface water in the south of China was improving and particle emissions were stable. But NO2 emissions were increasing rapidly and SO2 emissions had been increasing before decreasing in 2007, the last year for which data was available.

Conventional approaches to air quality monitoring are based on networks of static and sparse measurement stations. However, there are drivers behind current rises in the use of low-cost sensors for air pollution management in cities.

The immense urban growth of Chinese cities substantially increases the need for consumer goods, vehicles and energy. This in turn increases the burning of fossil fuels, resulting in smog. Exposure to Smog poses a threat to the health of Chinese citizens. A study from 2012 shows fine particles in the air, which cause respiratory and cardiovascular diseases are one of the key pollutants that are accounted for a large fraction of damage on the health of Chinese citizens.

Water pollution
The water resources of China are affected by both severe water shortages and severe water pollution. An increasing population and rapid economic growth, as well as lax environmental oversight, have increased water demand and pollution. According to an investigation in 1980, the entire country has 440 billion cubic meters of the total water consumption. Consumption by agriculture, forestry, husbandry, and country residents was about 88 per cent of the total consumption. However, an investigation shows that 19 per cent of water in main rivers has been polluted as well as a total length of 95,000 kilometers. In addition, a survey for 878 rivers in the early 1980s shows that 80 per cent of them were polluted to some extent, and fish became extinct in more than 5 per cent of total river length throughout the country. Furthermore, there are over 20 waterways unsuitable for agricultural irrigation due to water pollution. 
In response, China has taken measures such as rapidly building out the water infrastructure and increased regulation as well as exploring a number of further technological solutions.

Air pollution

Air pollution is a major public health issue in China. Over the past three decades, the rapid development of China has resulted in excessive emissions of greenhouse gases. Among the 337 cities, more than 40 percent of the major air pollutant concentrations exceeded Chinese standards. In the last few years, however, China has made significant progress in reducing air pollution. In 2016, only 84 out of 338 prefecture-level (administrative division of the People's Republic of China (PRC), ranking below a province and above a county) or higher cities attained the national standard for air quality. However, by 2018, those 338 cities enjoyed good air quality on 79% of days. The amount of harmful particulates in the air in China fell 40% from 2013 to 2020. 

Average PM2.5 concentrations fell by 33% from 2013 to 2017 in 74 cities. The overall pollution in China fell further 10% between 2017 and 2018. Another study shows that China reduced PM2.5 by 47% between 2005 and 2015. In August 2019, Beijing experienced the lowest PM2.5 on record—a low of 23 micrograms per cubic meter. Beijing is on track to drop out of the Top 200 most polluted cities by the end of 2019. The reasons are many fold: (1) Millions of homes and businesses are switching from coal to natural gas and (2) Afforestation measures. China is also the world's largest producer of electric cars, but lags a number of European countries and the U.S. regarding the number of electric cars per capita.

Air pollution levels dropped in early 2020 due to quarantines addressing the coronavirus pandemic. By early 2021, however, the levels had risen again.

The Chinese government realized that the pollution had an effect on its regime's satisfaction so it increased funding to reduce dissatisfaction. An example of this is that in 2013, China's Academy for Environmental Planning pledged $277 billion to combat urban air pollution. In the first batch of 74 cities that implemented the 2012 Environmental Air Quality Standards, the average concentration of PM2.5 and sulfur dioxide dropped by 42 percent and 68 percent, respectively, between 2013 and 2018.

Zhong Nanshan, the president of the China Medical Association, warned in 2012 that air pollution could become China's biggest health threat. Measurements by Beijing municipal government in January 2013 showed that highest recorded level of PM2.5 (particulate matter smaller than 2.5 micrometers in size), was at nearly 1,000 μg per cubic meter. PM2.5, consisting of K+, Ca2+, NO3−, and SO42-, had the most fearsome impact on people's health in Beijing throughout the year, especially in cold seasons. Traces of smog from mainland China has been observed to reach as far as California.

Sulfur dioxide emission peaked at 2006, after which it began to decline by 10.4% in 2008 compared to 2006. This was accompanied by improvements on related phenomenons such as lower frequency of acid rainfall. The adoption by power plants of flue-gas desulfurization technology was likely the main reason for reduced SO2 emissions.

Large-scale use of formaldehyde in make home building products in construction and furniture also contributes to indoor air pollution.

Particulates
Particulates are formed from both primary and secondary pathways. Primary sources such as coal combustion, biomass combustion and traffic directly emit particulate matter (PM). The emissions from power plants are considerably higher than in other countries, as most Chinese facilities do not employ any flue gas treatment. High secondary aerosol (particulates formed through atmospheric oxidation and reactions of gaseous organic compounds) contribution to particulate pollution in China is found. According to the U.S. Environmental Protection Agency, such fine particles can cause asthma, bronchitis, and acute and chronic respiratory symptoms such as shortness of breath and painful breathing, and may also lead to premature death.

According to the World Bank, the Chinese cities with the highest levels of particulate matter in 2004 of those studied were Tianjin, Chongqing, and Shenyang. In 2012 stricter air pollution monitoring of ozone and PM2.5 were ordered to be gradually implemented from large cities and key areas to all prefecture-level cities, and from 2015 all prefecture-level or higher cities were included. State media acknowledged the role of environmental campaigners in causing this change. On one micro-blog service, more than a million mostly positive comments were posted in less than 24 hours although some wondered if the standards would be effectively enforced.

The US embassy in Beijing regularly posts automated air quality measurements at @beijingair on Twitter. On 18 November 2010, the feed described the PM2.5 AQI (Air Quality Index) as "crazy bad" after registering a reading in excess of 500 for the first time. This description was later changed to "beyond index", a level which recurred in February, October, and December 2011.

In June 2012, following strongly divergent disclosures of particulate levels between the Observatory and the US Embassy, Chinese authorities asked foreign consulates to stop publishing "inaccurate and unlawful" data. Officials said it was "not scientific to evaluate the air quality of an area with results gathered from just only one point inside that area", and asserted that official daily average PM2.5 figures for Beijing and Shanghai were "almost the same with the results published by foreign embassies and consulates".

By January 2013 the pollution had worsened with official Beijing data showing an average AQI over 300 and readings of up to 700 at individual recording stations while the US Embassy recorded over 755 on 1 January and 800 by 12 January 2013.

On 21 October 2013, record smog closed the Harbin Airport along with all schools in the area. Daily particulate levels of more than 50 times the World Health Organization recommended daily level were reported in parts of the municipality.

In 2016, Beijing's yearly-average PM2.5 was 73 μg/m3, 9.9% improvement compared to 2015. In total, 39 severely polluted days were recorded, 5 fewer compared to 2015.

Government's response to the air pollution
In an attempt to reduce air pollution, the Chinese government has made the decision to enforce stricter regulations. After record-high air pollution in northern China in 2012 and 2013, the State Council issued an Action Plan for the Prevention and Control of Air Pollution in September 2013. This plan aims to reduce PM2.5 by over 10% from 2012 to 2017. The most prominent government response has been in Beijing, aiming to reduce PM2.5 by 25% from 2012 to 2017. As the capital of China, it is suffering from high levels of air pollution. According to Reuters, in September 2013, the Chinese government published the plan to tackle air pollution problem on its official website. The main goal of the plan is to reduce coal consumption by closing polluting mills, factories, and smelters, and switching to other eco-friendly energy sources.

These policies have been taking effect, and in 2015, the average PM2.5 in 74 key cities in monitoring system is 55 μg/m3, showing a 23.6% decrease as of 2013. Despite the reduction in coal consumption and polluting industries, China still maintained a stable economic growth rate from 7.7% in 2013 to 6.9% in 2015.

On 20 August 2015, ahead of the 70th-anniversary celebrations of the end of World War II, the Beijing government shut down industrial facilities and reduced car emissions in order to achieve a "Parade Blue" sky for the occasion. This action resulted in PM2.5 concentration lower than the 35 μg/m3 national air quality standard, according to data from Beijing Municipal Environmental Protection Monitoring Centre (BMEMC). The restrictions resulted in an average Beijing PM2.5 concentration of 19.5 μg/m3, the lowest that had ever been on record in the capital.

China's strategy has been mainly focusing on the development of other energy sources such as nuclear, hydro and compressed natural gas. The latest plan entails closing the outdated capacity of the industrial sectors like iron, steel, aluminum and cement and increasing nuclear capacity and other non-fossil fuel energy. It also includes an intention to stop approving new thermal power plants and to cut coal consumption in industrial areas.

According to research, substituting all coal consumption for residential and commercial use to natural gas requires additional 88 billion cubic meters of natural gas, which is 60% of China's total consumption in 2012, and the net cost would be 32–52 billion dollars. Substituting the share of coal-fired power plant with renewable and nuclear energy also requires 700GW additional capacity, which cost 184 billion dollars. So the net cost would be 140–160 billion dollars considering value of saved coal. Since all the above policies have been already partially implemented by national and city governments, they should lead to substantial improvements in urban air quality.

Four-color alert system
Beijing launched four-color alert system in 2013. It is based on the air quality index (AQI), which indicates how clean or polluted the air is.

The Beijing government revised their four-color alert system at the start of 2016, increasing the levels of pollution required to trigger orange and red alerts. The change was introduced to standardize the alert levels across four cities including Tianjin and four cities in Hebei, and perhaps in direct response to the red alerts issues the previous December.

Light pollution 

With active economic growth and a huge number of citizens, China is considered as the largest developing country in the world. Due to urbanization, light pollution generally is an environmental factor that significantly influences the quality and health of wildlife. According to Pengpeng Han et al., "In the 1990s, the increasing trend in light pollution regions mostly occurred in larger urban cities, which are mainly located in eastern and coastal areas, whereas the decreasing trend areas were chiefly industrial and mining cities rich in mineral resources, in addition to the central parts of large cities". In the 2000s, nearly all urban cities were dominated by an uprising trend in light pollution.

Common pollutants

Lead 
Lead poisoning was described in a 2001 paper as one of the most common pediatric health problems in China. A 2006 review of existing data suggested that one-third of Chinese children suffer from elevated serum lead levels. Pollution from metal smelters and a fast-growing battery industry has been responsible for most cases of, particularly high lead levels. In 2011, there were riots in the Zhejiang Haijiu Battery Factory from angry parents whose children received permanent neurological damage from lead poisoning. The central government has acknowledged the problem and has taken measures such as suspending battery factory production, but some see the response as inadequate and some local authorities have tried to silence criticisms.

A literature review of academic studies on Chinese children's blood lead levels found that the lead levels declined when comparing the studies published during 1995–2003 and 2004–2007 periods. Lead levels also showed a declining trend after China banned lead in gasoline in 2000. Lead levels were still higher than those in developed nations. Industrial areas had higher levels than suburban areas, which had higher levels than urban areas. Controlling and preventing lead poisoning was described as a long-term mission.

Persistent organic pollutants 
China is a signatory nation of the Stockholm Convention, a treaty to control and phase out major persistent organic pollutants (POP). A plan of action for 2010 includes objectives such as eliminating the production, import and use of the pesticides covered under the convention, as well as an accounting system for PCB containing equipment. For 2015, China plans to establish an inventory of POP-contaminated sites and remediation plans. Since May 2009, this treaty also covers polybrominated diphenyl ethers and perfluorooctanesulfonic acid. Perfluorinated compounds are associated with altered thyroid function and decreased sperm count in humans. China faces a big challenge in controlling and eliminating POPs, since they often are cheaper than their alternatives, or are unintentionally produced and then released into the environment to save on treatment costs.

Yellow dust 
The Yellow dust or Asian dust is a seasonal dust cloud which affects Northeast Asia during late winter and springtime. The dust originates in the deserts of Mongolia, northern China and Kazakhstan where high-speed surface winds and intense dust storms kick up dense clouds of fine, dry soil particles. These clouds are then carried eastward by prevailing winds and pass over Northern China into Korea and Japan.

Desertification has intensified in China. 1,740,000 square kilometres of land is classified as "dry", and desertification disrupts the lives of 400 million people and causes direct economic losses of 54 billion yuan ($7 billion) a year, SFA figures show. Sulfur (an acid rain component), soot, ash, carbon monoxide, and other toxic pollutants including heavy metals (such as mercury, cadmium, chromium, arsenic, lead, zinc, copper) and other carcinogens, often accompany the dust storms, as well as viruses, bacteria, fungi, pesticides, antibiotics, asbestos, herbicides, plastic ingredients, combustion products and hormone mimicking phthalates.

Coal 
The increasing number of air pollutants can cause incidences of low visibility for days and acid rain. According to the article "Air Pollution in Mega Cities in China", "Coal accounts for 70% of the total energy consumption, and emissions from coal combustion are the major anthropogenic contributors to air pollution in China." The Proceedings of the National Academy of Sciences also highlights the Huai River Policy established during China's central planning period between 1950 and 1980. The policy provided homes and offices with free coal for winter heating but was limited solely to the Northern region due to budget limitations. The policy led to a dramatic increase in coal consumption and production. Coal production alongside rapid economic growth has increased the emission of harmful pollutants such as carbon dioxide, sulfur dioxide, nitrogen oxide, and small particle matter known as PM2.5 and PM10. Long-term exposure to pollutants can cause health risks such as respiratory diseases, cancer, cardiovascular and cerebrovascular diseases. Coal is a huge issue because of the SO2 emissions from coal factories. According to the article, "SO2 exceeded the Chinese Grade-II standards in 22% of the country’s cities and caused acid rain problems in 38% of the cities."

Other pollutants 
In 2010, 49 employees at Wintek were poisoned by n-hexane in the manufacturing of touchscreens for Apple products.

In 2013, it was revealed that portions of the country's rice supply were tainted with the toxic metal cadmium.

Impact of pollution 

A 2006 Chinese green gross domestic product estimate stated that pollution in 2004 cost 3.05% of the nation's economy.

A 2007 World Bank and SEPA report estimated the cost of water and air pollution in 2003 to 2.68% or 5.78% of GDP depending on if using a Chinese or a Western method of calculation.

A 2009 review stated a range of 2.2–10% of GDP.

A 2012 study stated that pollution had little effect on economic growth which in China's case was largely dependent on physical capital expansion and increased energy consumption due to the dependency on manufacturing and heavy industries. China was predicted to continue to grow using energy-inefficient and polluting industries. While growth may continue, the rewards of this growth may be opposed by the harm from the pollution unless environmental protection is increased.

A 2013 study published in the Proceedings of the National Academy of Sciences found that severe pollution during the 1990s cut five and a half (5.5) years from the average life expectancy of people living in northern China, where toxic air has led to increased rates of stroke, heart disease and cancer.

A 2015 study from the non-profit organization Berkeley Earth estimated that 1.6 million people in China die each year from heart, lung and stroke problems because of polluted air.

Cross-border pollution

Criticisms of government environmental policies 

Critics point to the government's lack of willingness to protect the environment as a common problem with China's environmental policies. Even in the case of the latest plan, experts are skeptical about its actual influence because of the existence of loopholes. This is because economic growth is still the primary issue for the government, and overrides environmental protection.

However, if the measures to cut coal usage were applied strictly, it would also mean the dismantling of the local economy that is highly reliant on heavy industry. The Financial Times interviewed a worker who stated, "if this steel mill didn’t exist, we wouldn’t even have anywhere to go to eat. Everything revolves around this steel factory – our children work here."

Scientists have yet to agree on the impact of China's air pollution on neighboring countries. Some politicians in South Korea claim that  more than half of Korea's air pollution is caused by fine dust generated in China, but China disagrees.

Pollution ratings 
As of 2019:

The top five cities with the best air quality: Lhasa, Haikou, Zhoushan, Xiamen, Huangshan
The 10 cities with the worst air quality: Anyang, Xingtai, Shijiazhuang, Handan, Linfen, Tangshan, Taiyuan, Zibo, Jiaozuo, Jincheng

According to the National Environmental Analysis released by Tsinghua University and The Asian Development Bank in January 2013, seven of the ten most air polluted cities in the world are in China, including Taiyuan, Beijing, Urumqi, Lanzhou, Chongqing, Jinan and Shijiazhuang.

National Sword Policy

See also (some in only original Chinese)

2009 Chinese lead poisoning scandal
2013 Eastern China smog
2013 Northeastern China smog
Automotive industry in China
China Energy Conservation Investment Corporation
China Pollution Map Database
Climate change in China
Environment of China
Environmental issues in China
Phase-out of lightweight plastic bags
Brother Nut
List of power stations in China
Low-carbon economy
Peak oil
Renewable energy in China
List of countries by energy consumption and production
:Category:Energy by country

Haze
Smog

References

Further reading 
 Jared Diamond, Collapse: How Societies Choose to Fail or Succeed, Penguin Books, 2005 and 2011. See chapter 12 entitled "China, Lurching Giant" (pages 258–377).

External links 
Real-time air quality index map
Current global map of carbon monoxide concentration, centered on Beijing

Articles
 Cleaner Production in China – Current and comprehensive information source on China's campaign to reduce pollution
 Photo essay on water pollution in Huai River Basin
Most polluted cities in China
 Clearing the Air: China's Environmental Challenge – Asia Society – Overview on China air pollution problem
 Documentary project “Pollution in China.” 
Spill in China Underlines Environmental Concerns 2 March 2013 The New York Times

Videos
"The Environmental Challenge to China's Future", Dr. Elizabeth Economy, 2010
Accompanying the growth of industry is an increase in pollution and toxic waste that threatens the livelihood and health of people in rural fishing and farming communities.
Youtube video: China's Pollution Busters
Terrible Pollution in China
Environmental activist Wu Dengming documents.
Youtube video: Where does e-waste end up?
Youtube video: Exporting Harm trailer
Youtube video: Electronic Trash Village – China

 
Environmental issues in China
Articles containing video clips